Gadobenic acid (INN, brand name Multihance) is a complex of gadolinium with the ligand BOPTA. In the form of the methylglucamine salt meglumine gadobenate (INNm) or gadobenate dimeglumine (USAN), it is used as a gadolinium-based MRI contrast medium.

BOPTA is a derivative of DTPA in which one terminal carboxyl group, –C(O)OH is replaced by -C–O–CH2C6H5. Thus gadobenic acid is closely related to gadopentetic acid. BOPTA itself was first synthesized in 1995. In the "gadobenate" ion gadolinium ion is 9-coordinate with BOPTA acting as an 8-coordinating ligand. The ninth position is occupied by a water molecule, which exchanges rapidly with water molecules in the immediate vicinity of the strongly paramagnetic complex, providing a mechanism for MRI contrast enhancement. 139La NMR studies on the diamagnetic La-BOPTA2− complex suggest that the Gd complex maintains in solution the same kind of coordination as found, by X-ray crystallography, in the solid state for Gd-BOPTA disodium salt.

References

External links 
 
 

MRI contrast agents
Organogadolinium compounds